The 1980 Big Eight men's basketball tournament was held February 26–28 at a combination of on-campus gymnasiums and Kemper Arena in Kansas City, Missouri.

 defeated rivals Kansas in the championship game, 79–58, to win their second Big Eight men's basketball tournament.

The Wildcats, in turn, received a bid to the 1980 NCAA tournament. Missouri was the only other Big Eight team to receive an invite to this year's tournament.

Format
All eight of the conference's members participated in the tournament field. They were seeded based on regular season conference records, with all teams placed and paired in the initial quarterfinal round.

All first round games were played on the home court of the higher-seeded team. The semifinals and championship game, in turn, were played at a neutral site at Kemper Arena in Kansas City, Missouri.

Bracket

References

Tournament
Big Eight Conference men's basketball tournament
Big Eight Conference men's basketball tournament
Big Eight Conference men's basketball tournament